Mikalojus Konstantinas Čiurlionis (– ) was a Lithuanian composer, painter and writer in Polish.

Čiurlionis contributed to symbolism and art nouveau, and was representative of the fin de siècle epoch. He has been considered one of the pioneers of abstract art in Europe. During his short life, he composed about 400 pieces of music and created about 300 paintings, as well as many literary works and poems. The majority of his paintings are housed in the M. K. Čiurlionis National Art Museum in Kaunas, Lithuania. His works have had a profound influence on modern Lithuanian culture.

Biography
Mikalojus Konstantinas Čiurlionis was born in Senoji Varėna, a town in southeastern Lithuania that at the time was in the Russian Empire. He was the oldest of nine children of his father, Konstantinas, and his mother, Adelė née Radmanaitė (Radmann), who was descended from a Lutheran family of Bavarian origin. Like many educated Lithuanians of the time, Čiurlionis's family spoke Polish, and he began learning Lithuanian only after meeting his fiancée in 1907.

Čiurlionis was a musical prodigy: he could play by ear at age three and could sight-read music freely by age seven. Three years out of primary school, he went to study at the musical school of the Lithuanian noble Michał Mikołaj Ogiński in Plungė, where he learned to play several instruments, in particular the flute, from 1889 to 1893.  Supported by Prince Oginskis' 'scholarship' Čiurlionis studied piano and composition at Warsaw Conservatory from 1894 to 1899. For his graduation, in 1899, he wrote a cantata for mixed chorus and symphonic orchestra titled De Profundis, with the guidance of the composer Zygmunt Noskowski. Later he attended composition lectures at the Leipzig Conservatory from 1901 to 1902.

He returned to Warsaw in 1902 and studied drawing at the Warsaw School of Fine Arts from 1904 to 1906, and became a friend with Polish composer and painter . His main teacher in Warsaw was symbolist painter Kazimierz Stabrowski, who was also the founder of the first lodges of the Theosophical Society in Poland and passed to Čiurlionis an interest in Theosophy and other esoteric subjects. After the 1905 Russian Revolution, which resulted in the loosening of cultural restrictions on the Empire's minorities, he began to identify himself as a Lithuanian.

He was one of the initiators of, and a participant in, the First Exhibition of Lithuanian Art in 1907 at Vileišis Palace, Vilnius. Soon after this event, the Lithuanian Art Society was founded, and Čiurlionis was one of its 19 founding members.

In 1907, he became acquainted with Sofija Kymantaitė (1886–1958), an art critic. Through this association, Čiurlionis learned to speak better Lithuanian. Early in 1909, he married Kymantaitė. At the end of that year, he traveled to St. Petersburg, where he exhibited some of his paintings. On Christmas Eve, Čiurlionis fell into a profound depression and at the beginning of 1910 was hospitalized in a psychiatric hospital "Czerwony Dwór" (Red Manor) in Marki, Poland, northeast of Warsaw. While a patient there, he died of pneumonia in 1911 at 35 years of age. He was buried at the Rasos Cemetery in Vilnius. He never saw his daughter Danutė (1910–1995).

Čiurlionis felt that he was a synesthete; that is, he perceived colours and music simultaneously. Many of his paintings bear the names of musical pieces: sonatas, fugues, and preludes.

Posthumous recognition

After Čiurlionis's death in 1911, the Russian critic  (transliterated as Tschoudowsky in English) wrote: Now that he is dead, the authors of the spiritual revival of Lithuania present Ciurlionis (sic) as a national artist. It is not for us to judge; however his extraordinary independence of all contemporary art leads one to believe that he was really created by the hidden forces of his people; and it is well for us to be able to believe that this singular genius does not merely represent a chance caprice of fate, but is the precursor of a future sublime Lithuanian art. When I think of him, an idea imposes itself on my mind: the Lithuanian people had no Middle Ages, perhaps it has preserved intact until the 20th century, even better than we Russians, the immense energy of mystic life inherited from the Arians which our Western brothers have so prodigally squandered in their Middle Ages.In 1911, the first posthumous exhibition of Čiurlionis's art was held in Vilnius and Kaunas. During the same year, an exhibition of his art was held in Moscow, and in 1912 his works were exhibited in St. Petersburg. In 1944, the main art museum in Kaunas was renamed M. K. Čiurlionis National Art Museum and still hosts the majority of Čiurlionis paintings. In 1957, the Lithuanian community in Chicago opened the Čiurlionis Art Gallery, hosting collections of his works. In 1963, the Čiurlionis Memorial Museum was opened in Druskininkai, in the house where Čiurlionis and his family lived. This museum holds biographical documents as well as photographs and reproductions of the artist's works. The National M. K. Čiurlionis School of Art in Vilnius was named after him in 1965.

Čiurlionis inspired the Lithuanian composer Osvaldas Balakauskas' work Sonata of the Mountains (1975), and every four years junior musical performers from Lithuania and neighboring countries take part in the Čiurlionis Competition. 

Čiurlionis's works have been displayed at international exhibitions in Japan, Germany, Spain, and elsewhere. His paintings were featured at "Visual Music" fest, an homage to synesthesia that included the works of Wassily Kandinsky, James McNeill Whistler, and Paul Klee, at the Museum of Contemporary Art, Los Angeles in 2005.

In 2009, Genovaitė Kazokas published Musical Paintings, a book where she argued that Theosophy, esotericism and Spiritualism were important influences on Čiurlionis’ art.

A commemorative plaque has been placed on the building of the former hospital in Marki, Poland where Mikalojus Konstantinas Čiurlionis died in 1911.

Čiurlionis's life was depicted in the 2012 film Letters to Sofija, directed by Robert Mullan.

Musical works
The precise number of Čiurlionis musical compositions is not known – a substantial part of his manuscripts did not survive, including those that perished in the fire during the war. The ones available for us today include sketches, rough drafts, and fragments of his musical ideas. The nature of the archive determined the fact that Čiurlionis' works were finally published only a hundred years after the composer's death. Today, the archive amounts to almost 400 compositions, the major part of which are works for piano, but also significant opuses for symphony orchestra (symphonic poems In the Forest and The Sea, overture, cantata for choir and orchestra), string quartet, works for various choirs (original compositions and Lithuanian folk song arrangements), as well as works for organ.

Some of his most-performed musical works include:

Orchestral
Miške (In the Forest), symphonic poem for orchestra (1901; published posthumously)
Kęstutis, Symphonic Overture (1902; piano score survives, orchestrated by Robertas Šervenikas)
Jūra (The Sea), symphonic poem for orchestra (1907; published posthumously)
Pasaulio sutvėrimas (The Creation of the World), Symphonic Poem (c. 1907; reconstructed by Arvydas Malcys)
Dies Irae, Symphonic Poem (c. 1910, reconstructed by Giedrius Kuprevičius)

Choral
Folk songs for choir
De Profundis, for choir and orchestra

Chamber music
String Quartet in C minor

Piano
Nocturne in C-sharp minor 
Prelude in B-flat minor
Prelude in F-sharp major
Nocturne in F minor
Impromptu in F-sharp minor
Prelude in A major
Prelude in D flat major
Fugue in B minor
Karalaitės kelionė: Pasaka (The Princess's Journey: A Fairy Tale)

Organ
Seven fugues for organ (Fugue in G minor)

Paintings
Some of the most popular Mikalojus Konstantinas Čiurlionis paintings include:

The Gift of Friendship (1906)
Cycle Winter (1906–1907)
Cycle The Zodiac (1907)
Sonatas (1907–1908)
Cycle Fairy-Tale (1909)
 Creation of the World
 Sonata of the Spring (1907)
 Sonata of the Summer (1908)
 Sonata of the Sun (1907)
 Sonata of the Sea (1908)
 Sonata of the Pyramids (1908)
 Stellar Sonata (1908)
 Sonata of the Serpent (1908)
 Diptych Prelude and Fugue (1908)
 Triptych Fantasy (1908)
 Other Preludes and Fugues
 Winter – Cycle of Eight Pictures (1906–07)
 Spring – Four Pictures (1907–08)
 Summer – Cycle of Three Pictures (1907–08)

Gallery

Family
Mikalojus had four brothers: Povilas Čiurlionis (1884-1945),  (1887-1944), Petras Čiurlionis (1890-1924),  (1891-1955) and four sisters: Marija Čiurlionytė (1879-1969), Juzė Čiurlionytė-Stulgaitienė (1882-1966), Valerija Čiurlionytė-Karužienė (1896-1982),  (1898-1992).

See also
List of things named after Mikalojus Konstantinas Čiurlionis
Rokas Zubovas

Notes

References

Further reading

 Andriušytė-Žukienė Rasute. 2002. The Art of Mikalojus Konstantinas Čiurlionis: At the Junction of Two Epochs. Vilnius: Organisation Committee Frankfurt.
 Andriušytė-Žukienė, Rasute. 2004. M.K. Čiurlionis: Tarp Simbolizmo ir Modernizmo.Vilnius: Versus Aureus.
 Čiurlionytė, Jadwyga. 1973. Atsiminimai apie M. K. Čiurlionį. Vilnius: Vaga.
 Goštautas, Stasys with Birutė Vaičjurgis-Šležas, editors. 1994. Čiurlionis: Painter and Composer. Collected Essays and Notes, 1906–1989. Vilnius: Vaga.
 Kazokas, Genovaitė. 2009. Musical Paintings: Life and Work of M. K. Čiurlionis (1875–1911). Vilnius: Logotipas.
 Rannit, Aleksis. 1984. M.K. Čiurlionis: Lithuanian Visionary Painter. Chicago: Lithuanian Library Press.
 Užukauskaitė, Lina. 2019. Ein ikonisches Paar: Mikalojus Konstantinas Čiurlionis’ Briefe an Sofija. In: Liebesgeschichte(n): Identität und Diversität vom 18. bis zum 21. Jahrhundert. Hg. v. Frank Becker und Elke Reinhardt- Becker. Frankfurt am Main, New York: Campus, 131-149. ISBN 9783593510293
 Vorobjov, Nikolai. 1938. M.K. Čiurlionis, der litauisches Maler und Musiker. Kaunas and Leipzig: Verlag Pribačis.

External links

 Mikalojus Konstantinas Čiurlionis: Life, Paintings, Music
 Biography at the Lithuanian Music Information and Publishing Centre
 
 The complete Piano Music of Mikalojus Konstantinas Čiurlionis: Nikolaus Lahusen/Rokas Zubovas
 
 

1875 births
1911 deaths
19th-century classical composers
19th-century Lithuanian painters
19th-century male musicians
20th-century classical composers
20th-century Lithuanian painters
20th-century male musicians
Lithuanian classical composers
Lithuanian people of German descent
Male classical composers
Romantic composers
Art Nouveau painters
Symbolist painters
Academy of Fine Arts in Warsaw alumni
Chopin University of Music alumni
People from Troksky Uyezd
People from Varėna District Municipality
Pupils of Salomon Jadassohn
Burials at Rasos Cemetery
Deaths from pneumonia in Poland
Lithuanian writers in Polish